WTKC (89.7 FM) is a radio station licensed to Findlay, Ohio, United States, the station serves Findlay's college area and surrounding townships.  The station is currently owned by Faith Educational Media, Inc.

References

External links
WTKC

TKC